The Women's 200 Butterfly swimming event at the 2009 SEA Games was held in December 2009.

The Games Record at the start of the event was 2:14.11 by Singapore's TAO Li swum at the 2005 SEA Games (on December 3, 2005).

Results

Final

Preliminary heats

References

Swimming at the 2009 Southeast Asian Games
2009 in women's swimming